Virginia's Blue Ridge–TWENTY24 is a professional Women's road bicycle racing team based in the United States. The team's most notable riders are 3-time Olympic time trial champion Kristin Armstrong, 2013 Giro d'Italia Femminile overall winner Mara Abbott, and 3-time Olympic medalist Jennifer Valente.

Team history
The team was founded in 2005 as ProMan Hit Squad, but in 2009 the team was renamed Twenty12 to reflect the team's focus on developing riders for the 2012 Olympic Games. This subsequently brought Exergy on board as a sponsor of the team as well as receiving UCI status. For the 2013 season (and after the 2012 Olympics) the team was renamed Exergy Twenty16 to reflect the new focus on the 2016 Olympic Games, however in late 2013 Exergy's sponsorship of the team ended.

For the 2014 season the team dropped back down to a Nationally ranked elite women's team and primarily raced the US domestic circuit. In preparation for the 2015 season the team signed double World Team Time Trial champion Carmen Small as well as 2014 Gent–Wevelgem champion Lauren Hall. The team also signed; Jess Cerra, Lauren Komanski, Allie Dragoo, Kaitie Antonneau, Andrea Dvorak, Alison Jackson, Allison Arensman, Amber Gaffney, Maddy Boutet and Summer Moak.

In October 2020, the team announced they would be changing their name to Twenty24 Pro Cycling and would focus on developing riders for the 2024 Olympics.

Team roster

Major wins

2012
Stage 1 Women's Tour of New Zealand, Kristin Armstrong
Stage 1 The Exergy Tour, Theresa Cliff-Ryan
Stage 8 La Route de France, Andrea Dvorak
2013
 Overall Giro d'Italia Femminile, Mara Abbott
Stages 5 & 6, Mara Abbott
2015
Stage 1 Redlands Bicycle Classic, Alison Jackson
Chrono Gatineau, Carmen Small
Stage 3 Holland Ladies Tour, Lauren Hall
2016
Stage 2 Tour of California, Team time trial
 Youth classification Tour of California, Chloé Dygert
Team classification Tour of California
Overall Valley of the Sun, Allie Dragoo
Stage 1 (ITT), Allie Dragoo
Stages 2 & 3, Alison Jackson
Overall San Dimas Stage Race, Kristin Armstrong
Stage 1 (ITT)
2017
Stage 3 (ITT) Tour of the Gila, Leah Thomas
Teams classification Cascade Cycling Classic
 Combination classification Tour Cycliste Féminin International de l'Ardèche, Leah Thomas
2018
Overall Chico Stage Race, Allie Dragoo
Stage 3 (ITT), Allie Dragoo
Overall San Dimas Stage Race, Jasmin Glaesser
Stages 1 (ITT) & 2, Jasmin Glaesser
Stage 3, Erica Clevenger 
 Youth classification Joe Martin Stage Race, Chloé Dygert
Stage 4, Chloé Dygert
Stages 2 & 3 (ITT) Tour of the Gila, Chloé Dygert
Stage 3 Redlands Bicycle Classic, Jasmin Glaesser
Central American and Caribbean Sports Games Track Championships 
Scratch Race, Marlies Mejías
Team Pursuit, Marlies Mejías
Individual Pursuit, Marlies Mejías
2019
 Overall Joe Martin Stage Race, Chloé Dygert
Stages 1 & 4, Chloé Dygert
 Overall Tour of the Gila, Chloé Dygert
Stages 3 (ITT) & 4 
Chrono Kristin Armstrong, Chloé Dygert
 Overall Colorado Classic, Chloé Dygert
 Points classification, Chloé Dygert
 Mountains classification, Chloé Dygert
 Young rider classification, Chloé Dygert
Stages 1, 2, 3 & 4, Chloé Dygert
Chrono Kristin Armstrong, Chloé Dygert
2019–20 UCI Track Cycling World Cup – Minsk
Omnium, Jennifer Valente
Team Pursuit, Jennifer Valente
Team Pursuit, Chloé Dygert
Points Race, Jennifer Valente
Omnium, 2019–20 UCI Track Cycling World Cup – Brisbane, Jennifer Valente

National, continental, world and Olympic champions

2012
 Olympic Time Trial, Kristin Armstrong
 USA Track (Team Pursuit), Jacquelyn Crowell
 USA Track (Points race), Jacquelyn Crowell
2013
 USA U23 Time Trial, Kaitlin Antonneau
 USA U23 Road Race, Kaitlin Antonneau
 USA Track (Scratch race), Jennifer Valente
2015
 Panamerican Time Trial, Carmen Small
 USA Time Trial, Kristin Armstrong
2016
 Olympic Time Trial, Kristin Armstrong
2017
 Word Track (Team pursuit), Chloé Dygert
 Panamerican Time Trial, Chloé Dygert
 Panamerican Track (Madison), Stephanie Roorda
 Canada Track (Team Pursuit), Annie Foreman-Mackey
2018
 Word Track (Team pursuit), Chloé Dygert
 Cuba Time Trial, Marlies Mejías
 USA Track (Omnium), Jennifer Valente
 Panamerican Track (Team Pursuit), Jennifer Valente
 Panamerican Track (Scratch Race), Jennifer Valente
 Panamerican Track (Points Race), Jennifer Valente
2019
 USA Track (Omnium), Jennifer Valente
 USA Track (Scratch Race), Jennifer Valente
 USA Track (Madison), Jennifer Valente
 USA Track (Points Race), Jennifer Valente
 Panamerican Track (Team Pursuit), Chloé Dygert
 Panamerican Track (Team Pursuit), Georgia Simmerling
 Panamerican Track (Omnium), Jennifer Valente
 Panamerican Track (Scratch Race), Jennifer Valente
 Panamerican Track (Individual Pursuit), Georgia Simmerling
 Panamerican Track (Madison), Jennifer Valente
 Panamerican Track (Points Race), Jennifer Valente
 Panamerican Time Trial, Chloé Dygert
 World Time Trial, Chloé Dygert
 Canada Track (Individual Pursuit), Georgia Simmerling
 Canada Track (Omnium), Stephanie Roorda

References

External links

UCI Women's Teams
Cycling teams based in the United States
Women's sports teams in the United States
Cycling teams established in 2005
2005 establishments in the United States